A linear script is a script that is produced through linear writing, such as the Latin script (as opposed to Braille, Morse code, semaphore, finger-spelling, etc.), or, more specifically,
Linear A of Crete
Linear B of Crete
Linear Elamite